The 1992 United States Senate election in Vermont was held on November 3, 1992. Incumbent Democratic U.S. Senator Patrick Leahy won re-election to a fourth term.

This was the last time in which a Republican candidate won Caledonia county in a senate election, and would be the last time until 2016 that a Republican candidate would win a county in Vermont.

Democratic primary

Candidates
 Patrick Leahy, incumbent U.S. Senator

Results

Republican Primary

Candidates
 Jim Douglas, Secretary of State of Vermont
 John Gropper, businessman

Results

Liberty Union primary

Candidates
 Jerry Levy, sociologist and perennial candidate

Results

General election

Candidates
 Jim Douglas (Republican), Secretary of State of Vermont
 Michael Godeck (Freedom for LaRouche)
 Patrick Leahy (Democratic), incumbent U.S. Senator
 Jerry Levy (Liberty Union), sociologist and perennial candidate

Results

See also
 1992 United States Senate elections

References

1992 Vermont elections
Vermont
1992